The 2012 United States Senate election in Arizona was held November 6, 2012, alongside a presidential election, other elections to the United States Senate in other states, as well as elections to the United States House of Representatives and various state and local elections. Incumbent Republican U.S. Senator Jon Kyl, the Senate Minority Whip, decided to retire instead of running for reelection to a fourth term. Republican U.S. Representative Jeff Flake won the open seat.

Republican primary
The filing deadline for Republican candidates was June 1, 2012, and the primary election took place on August 28, 2012.

Candidates

Declared
 Wil Cardon, CEO of a real estate investment firm
 Jeff Flake, U.S. Representative from the 6th district
 Bryan Hackbarth, former Mayor of Youngtown
 Clair Van Steenwyk, conservative radio host

Withdrew
 Doug McKee, businessman

Declined
 Fife Symington III, former Arizona governor
 Joe Arpaio, Maricopa County sheriff (running for re-election as Sheriff)
 Jan Brewer, Arizona governor
 Trent Franks, U.S. representative
 J. D. Hayworth, former U.S. representative
 Jon Kyl, incumbent U.S. senator
 Ben Quayle, U.S. representative
 David Schweikert, U.S. representative
 John Shadegg, former U.S. representative

Endorsements

Polling

Results

Democratic primary
Former Surgeon General Richard Carmona was the only candidate for the Democratic nomination, receiving all 289,881 votes cast in the primary election.

Candidates

Declared
 Richard Carmona, former Surgeon General of the United States

Withdrew
 Don Bivens, former Chairman of the Arizona Democratic Party
 David Ruben, physician

Declined
 Dennis Burke, United States Attorney
 Phil Gordon, Mayor of Phoenix
 Ed Pastor, U.S. Representative
 Warren Stewart, civil rights leader
 Gabby Giffords, former U.S. Representative
 Mark Kelly, astronaut and husband of Gabrielle Giffords, (later elected to Arizona's Class 3 Senate seat in 2020).
 Janet Napolitano, U.S. Secretary of Homeland Security and former Arizona governor
 Jim Pederson, former Arizona Democratic Party chairman and 2006 Democratic nominee for U.S. Senate

Polling

Results

General election

Candidates
 Jeff Flake (Republican), U.S. Representative
 Richard Carmona (Democratic), former U.S. Surgeon General
 Michael F. Meyer (Independent)
 Marc J. Victor (Libertarian), attorney

Debates
There were three debates before the election. The first was in Phoenix on October 10, 2012, the second in Tucson on October 15 and the last was in Yuma on October 25.
External links
 Complete video of debate, October 10, 2012 – C-SPAN
 Complete video of debate, October 15, 2012 – C-SPAN
 Complete video of debate, October 25, 2012 – C-SPAN

Fundraising

Top contributors

Top industries

Predictions

Polling

Republican primary

Democratic primary

with Don Bivens

with J.D. Hayworth

with Jeff Flake

with Jon Kyl

with Sarah Palin

Results
Preliminary results showed Flake leading 49.7–45.7%, but 439,961 early votes had yet to be counted.

See also
 2012 United States Senate elections
 2012 United States House of Representatives elections in Arizona

References

External links
 Arizona Secretary of State – Elections
 Campaign contributions at OpenSecrets.org
 Outside spending at the Sunlight Foundation
 Candidate issue positions at On the Issues

Official campaign websites (Archived)
 Richard Carmona for U.S. Senate
 Jeff Flake for U.S. Senate
 Ian Gilyeat for U.S. Senate
 Marc J. Victor For Senate

2012
Arizona
United States Senate